Cedar Creek Township may refer to:

Arkansas
 Cedar Creek Township, Crawford County, Arkansas, in Crawford County, Arkansas

Indiana
 Cedar Creek Township, Allen County, Indiana
 Cedar Creek Township, Lake County, Indiana

Michigan
 Cedar Creek Township, Muskegon County, Michigan
 Cedar Creek Township, Wexford County, Michigan

Missouri
 Cedar Creek Township, Wayne County, Missouri

North Carolina
 Cedar Creek Township, Cumberland County, North Carolina, in Cumberland County, North Carolina

North Dakota
 Cedar Creek Township, Slope County, North Dakota, in Slope County, North Dakota

Township name disambiguation pages